'First Quest may refer to

 First Quest a gaming system for Dungeons & Dragons
 First Quest a series of books written for the Dungeons & Dragons game.